One Love Roller Dolls (OLRD) is a women's flat track roller derby league based in Antwerp, Belgium. Founded in 2010, the league currently consists of two teams which competes against teams from other leagues. One Love is a member of the Women's Flat Track Derby Association (WFTDA).

History
The league was founded in February 2010 by four local women: Lolli Chop, An C Hammer, Cherry Moshpit and Queen Sil.  It affiliated with the local roller skating club, Kon Klopstokia RHC, thereby gaining access to its training facilities.

One Love was the second roller derby league established in Belgium,
and in December 2011, One Love and the Gent Go-Go Rollergirls were named as the top two Belgian leagues by Het Laatste Nieuws.

In July 2012, One Love was accepted as a member of the Women's Flat Track Derby Association Apprentice Programme. In October 2014 the league graduated to be a full WFTDA member.

Games and tournaments
The One Love Roller Dolls have played numerous games and several tournaments (in and outside Belgium) in their career, which helped them establish an impressive position on the European Rankings. They are also organizers of the Benelux tournament Skates of Glory.

WFTDA rankings

References

Sport in Antwerp
Roller derby leagues established in 2010
Roller derby leagues in Belgium
Women's Flat Track Derby Association leagues
2010 establishments in Belgium